The Florida Association of Public Procurement Officials (FAPPO) is a public purchasing association based in Florida.  Established in 1968, FAPPO is one of the oldest and most widely recognized professional statewide procurement organizations. 

FAPPO’s membership consists of approximately 1,100 procurement professionals representing over 300 public agencies throughout the State of Florida.  FAPPO membership is composed of many different types of local government agencies, including municipalities, counties, state, special districts and authorities, universities and colleges, public utilities and sheriff's offices.

FAPPO's activities
These include:
Fostering and promoting advancement in the public purchasing profession through diverse education, certification and networking.
Providing a forum for the exchange of procurement information.
Developing and promoting best practices for public agencies.
Providing resources for electronic access of public agencies' procurement documents.

External links
FAPPO website

Organizations based in Florida
Government procurement in the United States